Matt Rea may refer to:

 Matthew Rea (born 1991), gridiron football fullback
 Matt Rea (Gaelic footballer) (1873–1942), Irish Gaelic footballer